Allium pevtzovii is a Chinese species of wild onion found only in the southwestern part of Xinjiang Uygur Province in extreme western China.

Allium pevtzovii has a cluster of narrow, cylindrical bulbs. Umbel is a dense cluster of red, lustrous flowers.

References

pevtzovii
Onions
Flora of Xinjiang
Plants described in 1930